Events in the year 2023 in Nauru.

Incumbents
 President: Russ Kun 
 Speaker of Parliament: Marcus Stephen

Events 
 19 January – The second group of refugees, four in total, to be resettled from the Australian offshore detention centers in Nauru to New Zealand arrive.
 23 January – The Nauruan government releases a statement claiming to have been unaware of its consul-general in Thailand, Onassis Dame, rented a property involved in criminal activity. The Nauruan government announced that it will launch its own investigation into the allegations against Consul-General Dame.
 30 January
Taiwanese Ambassador Dean-Shiang Lin presents his credentials to President Kun.
Nauru receives USD 10,000 dollars from the Philippines in response to a call for assistance after its first outbreak of COVID-19 in June 2022.
 7 February – Australian Home Affairs Minister Clare O’Neil moves to renew deal which designates Nauru as Australia's regional processing centre.
 13 February – During the 21st meeting of the Micronesian Presidents' Summit in Pohnpei, President Kun hands over the chairmanship of the organization to the Federated States of Micronesia.

References

 
2020s in Nauru
Years of the 21st century in Nauru
Nauru
Nauru